Hans-Konrad Trümpler (born 15 August 1960) is a Swiss rower. He won the gold medal in the coxless four at the 1982 World Rowing Championships.

References 
 
 

1960 births
Living people
Swiss male rowers
Olympic rowers of Switzerland
Rowers at the 1980 Summer Olympics
Rowers at the 1984 Summer Olympics
World Rowing Championships medalists for Switzerland